Merchant Marine Academy may refer to:
Philippine Merchant Marine Academy
United States Merchant Marine Academy